North Dakota Highway 14 (ND 14) is a  north–south state highway in the U.S. state of North Dakota. ND 14's southern terminus is at Interstate 94 (I-94) and U.S. Route 83 (US 83) west of Hague, and the northern terminus is a continuation as Manitoba Highway 21 (PTH 21) at the Canada–United States border.

Junctions

References

014
Transportation in Burleigh County, North Dakota
Transportation in Sheridan County, North Dakota
Transportation in McHenry County, North Dakota
Transportation in Bottineau County, North Dakota